The ice pick is a pointed metal tool used from the 1800s to the 1900s to break, pick or chip at ice. The design consists of a sharp metal spike attached to a wooden handle. The tool's design has been relatively unchanged since its creation. The only notable differences in the design are the material used for the handle. The handle material is usually made out of wood but can also be made from plastic or rubber. These materials can be better in terms of safety and allow the user to better grip the pick during use.

History 
During the 1800s, ice blocks were gathered from frozen water sources and distributed to nearby homes. Ice picks were used to easily cut the blocks into smaller pieces for use. In many cases these smaller blocks were used in iceboxes. Iceboxes are similar in use to refrigerators with the major difference being that iceboxes could only stay cold for a limited time. They needed to be restocked with ice regularly to continue proper functioning. The ice pick slowly began to lose popularity in the early to mid-1900s due to the creation of the modern refrigerator. Many refrigerators came with a built-in ice maker which allowed for easy access to small ice chunks at anytime and eliminated the need for the ice pick. Today, the ice pick has become basically obsolete.

Characteristics 
The effectiveness of an ice pick is dependent on the weight of the pick and the force by the user. Most ice picks are pointed with a slight bend at the tip. If the tip is bent, the ice shatters upon striking. The bent tip allows for large chunks to break off in comparison to a tip that is straight. To avoid the handle slipping, most ice picks feature a knob at the end. Most picks have a wood handle made out of spruce as it is sturdy. The wood handle also helps to prevent the users hand from freezing. The steel bar in an ice pick is affixed to the wood handle.

Use in bartending 
One way that the ice pick is still used today is through bartending. Bartenders go to great lengths to create new and unique beverages. In many cases a bartender will use an ice pick to create various shapes out of blocks of ice. This allows them to create a unique ice creation to add to any beverage.

Use as weapon 
Because of its availability and ability to puncture the skin easily, the ice pick has sometimes been used as a weapon. Most notoriously, New York's organized crime groups known as Murder Incorporated made extensive use of the ice pick as a weapon during the 1930s and 1940s. There were up to 1,000 murders committed by this group. In 1932, the bodies of two young men were found who had been stabbed numerous times with an ice pick. A man named Jacob Drucker was found guilty of murdering a man in 1944. His victim had been stabbed with an ice pick over 20 times. The most feared hitman of his day, Abe Reles, used the ice pick as his weapon of choice, usually stabbing his victims in the ear.

According to New York City police, ice picks are still used today as street weapons. On August 21, 2012, a man was attacked with an ice pick in the Bronx. John Martinez, a man from the Bronx, was convicted of several robberies using an ice pick in 2011.

Murderer Richard Kuklinski, who claimed to have killed over 200 people, was reported to have used an ice pick among other weapons.

Leon Trotsky is sometimes incorrectly said to have been killed with an ice pick. He was actually killed with an ice axe, a mountaineering tool.

An ice pick (later revealed as a screwdriver) and a kitchen knife were used by Luka Magnotta to murder Jun Lin in 2012.

In 2018, a 25-year-old man was killed at a Jamaica bus stop when he was stabbed with an ice pick.

Use in medicine 
The lobotomy was a medical treatment that gained popularity during the mid-1930s. Lobotomist Walter Freeman performed thousands of lobotomies across the world. Reportedly, he used an ice pick from his family's kitchen. The pick would be inserted into the brain through the eye socket. The procedure would be done without the use of anesthetics. This "Ice Pick Lobotomy," was believed to diminish mental issues however these often resulted in paralysis and early death. This treatment failed due to a lack of testing before being performed on thousands of people. Walter Freeman's medical license was revoked in 1967 after a woman died during a lobotomy. This method of lobotomy led to the deaths of around 500 people over the course of 50 years. By the 1970s, The procedure would be banned in many countries for being inhumane.

References

External links 

Mechanical hand tools